The Blue Bird Micro Bird is a bus body produced in the United States and Canada by Blue Bird Corporation.  First introduced in 1975, the Micro Bird body is combined with a cutaway van chassis, with passenger capacity ranging from 10 to 30 passengers.  While most examples are produced as a school bus, the Micro Bird has been sold in various configurations, including commercial-use minibuses and as a MFSAB (Multi-Function School Activity Buses).  MFSABs are alternatives to 15-passenger vans; examples have come into use by child care centers and other organizations (including school systems) due to updated safety regulations.

Since 2010, the Blue Bird Micro Bird has been produced as part of a joint venture with Blue Bird and Girardin Minibus, called Micro Bird, Inc.  Final assembly currently takes place at the Girardin facilities in Drummondville, Quebec, Canada.

Background 
During the 1960s and early 1970s, small school buses in the United States and Canada were heavily derived from production vehicles.  Along with full-size vans such as the Dodge A100, the Chevrolet ChevyVan/GMC Handi-Van, and the Ford Econoline, large "carryall" SUVs were also used (such as the Chevrolet Suburban/GMC Carryall and International Travelall).  To increase the safety of small vehicles transporting students, bus manufacturers chose to design a bus body that mated a production vehicle chassis with a body designed with the same reinforced internal structure of a large school bus.

In 1973, Wayne Corporation introduced the Wayne Busette, the first school bus to successfully use a cutaway van chassis with a school bus body.  To increase its stability over a van or an SUV, the Busette chassis (the Chevrolet/GMC G30) utilized a dual rear-wheel axle.

As a response to the Busette, Blue Bird designers sought to develop their own body for a cutaway chassis.  Dubbed the Micro Bird,  the body distinguished itself from the Busette with several key features, many of them geared towards aiding the loading/unloading process.  Rather than use the stock van door as part of the entrance, Blue Bird designed the Micro Bird body to utilize a standard school bus door, the same design used on Conventional and All American full-size buses.  Ahead of the entry door, two windows were added, further aiding visibility; to this day, this layout is copied in virtually all cutaway-chassis buses.  While the Busette was designed with its own body from the ground up, the Micro Bird shared the design of its body with the Conventional; the key change was its narrower width to properly fit the van chassis.

At its launch, the intended markets for the Micro Bird were districts transporting small children or special needs students (the Micro Bird would become popular with the "Handy Bus" option, fitted with a wheelchair lift).

Design overview

Body

First generation (1975-2010) 
During its 35-year production run, the body design of the first-generation Blue Bird Micro Bird saw a gradual degree of change, with many updates tied to redesigns of its cutaway van chassis.  During the 1980s, to aid in driver visibility, Blue Bird replaced the two-piece loading-zone window with a larger single-piece window; to do so, a portion of the van chassis passenger-side door was replaced with glass.

Following the introduction of the Chevrolet Express/GMC Savana cutaway bus chassis for the 1997 model year, Blue Bird would make several major changes to the Micro Bird body, including a higher roofline and wider body.  In a move to increase interior headroom, the curve of the roof was flattened slightly; in the interest of aerodynamics, the front and rear roof caps were replaced by re-profiled fiberglass versions.  For exterior body panels, Blue Bird switched from steel to aluminum construction.  On Ford-chassis Micro Birds, Blue Bird made a flat floor standard on all Handy Buses.

Following the end of the first joint venture with Girardin Minibus in 1999, Blue Bird commenced development of its own body for a single rear-wheel cutaway chassis.  Making its debut in 2001, the Micro Bird SW (single rear wheel) was produced in two variants: a lower-roofline body (similar to the MB-II, and largely intended as a MFSAB) and a version with a roofline nearly matching the dual rear-wheel Micro Bird in height.  Later in the 2000s, the fiberglass roofcap of the body saw a second redesign.

After Blue Bird formed its second joint venture with Girardin in late 2009, Blue Bird ended production of the first-generation Micro Bird at the end of the 2010 model year.  After 35 years of production, the Micro Bird was the longest-produced Blue Bird after the Conventional/CV200 and the All American.  It would also be the final Blue Bird-produced model to have its chassis production outsourced to another manufacturer.

MB-II/MB-IV (1992-1999; 2010-present) 
Blue Bird and Quebec-based manufacturer Girardin Minibus have produced cutaway school bus bodies in two separate joint ventures; the first joint venture was from 1992 to 1999 while the second has been in place since 2009.

In 1992, the two companies organized a distribution agreement, with Blue Bird selling the Girardin MB-II and MB-IV buses in its sales network ("Blue Bird MBII/IV by Girardin" badging) alongside the Micro Bird.  Launched in 1991, there were two buses in the Girardin MB Series.  The MB-IV was produced for dual rear-wheel chassis (similar in configuration to the Blue Bird Micro Bird); the MB-II was produced for single rear-wheel chassis.  In a large departure from manufacturing precedent of the time, the MB-II was constructed as a cutaway bus body rather than as a conversion of a passenger van to a school bus.  In another departure from precedent, the MB-series buses utilized aluminum body panels in place of steel. The MB-II was offered with two different entry door configurations: a standard bus door (standard on Ford-chassis buses) and a van-style door (standard on Chevrolet/GMC G-van prior to 1997).

In 2009, Girardin Minibus entered its second joint venture with Blue Bird.  The partnership, named Micro Bird, Inc., consolidated all Type A school bus production at the Girardin facilities in Drummondville, Quebec, Canada.  Under the agreement, Blue Bird shifted production of van-based buses to Girardin (to again sell under the Blue Bird brand) while Blue Bird concentrated on design and production of full-size buses.  As part of the joint venture, the MB-II returned to the Blue Bird product line during 2010, serving as the replacement for the single rear-wheel Micro Bird.

G5 (2010-present) 
During 2005, Girardin Minibus introduced the G5, serving as the replacement for the MB-IV.  As part of Micro Bird, Inc., the G5 became a Blue Bird in 2010, replacing the long-running first-generation Micro Bird.  Distinguished by its squared-off roofline, the G5 is built solely on dual rear-wheel chassis.  Starting in 2013, as with all Blue Birds, the design of the roofline "streamer" (roof stripe) was changed from a full-length design to a single-length design shared with the MB-II, Vision, and All American. An electric version of the micro bird G5 built on Ford E450 chassis is set to commerce production for 2019.

T-Series (2014-present) 
In October 2014, Micro Bird launched its third product range, the T-Series.  The first school bus body developed for the Ford Transit cutaway van chassis, the T-Series derives its body from the MB-II, but with a different roofline and redesigned loading-door window.

In contrast to the MB-II and G5, the T-Series is sold with either single or dual rear-wheel configurations.

Chassis 
Prior to the 1992 redesign of the Ford E-Series, the Micro Bird was produced nearly exclusively on the Chevrolet/GMC G30 dual rear-wheel cutaway van chassis.

Alongside the MB-Series, the Micro Bird expanded chassis availability to the Ford E-Series starting in 1992.  From 1994 to 1996, General Motors offered a second chassis for the Micro Bird; to produce a heavier-duty version of its cutaway van, GM placed the cab of the G30 van on the higher-GVWR frame of the P30 "step-van" chassis; these versions are distinguished by an extended nose with a tilt-forward hood.  The heavy-duty GM chassis was discontinued after 1996, as the company redesigned its full-size van line and the new Chevrolet Express/GMC Savana did not have bodywork designed to fit on the P30 chassis.

In 2014, Blue Bird became the first North American bus manufacturer to develop a body for the Ford Transit 350/350HD chassis that is replacing the Ford E-Series.  Using a version of the Girardin MB body (Micro Bird T-Series), both single and dual rear-wheel configurations are produced.

Chassis Manufacturers

Assembly
Prior to 2010, Blue Bird assembled the Micro Bird at the following manufacturing facilities:
Blue Bird Body Company in Fort Valley, Georgia (1975–2010)
Blue Bird Midwest in Mount Pleasant, Iowa (1975–2002)
Blue Bird Canada in Brantford, Ontario, Canada (1975–2007)

See also

Blue Bird Corporation
Blue Bird Mini Bird
Wayne Busette
Thomas Minotour
 List of buses

References

External links
 Blue Bird corporation website

School buses
Micro Bird
Vehicles introduced in 1975